Parliamentary elections were held in Iraq on 1 April 1989, having originally been scheduled for 31 August 1988, but postponed due to the Iran–Iraq War. The elections were contested by 921 candidates, and saw the Ba'ath Party win 207 of the 250 seats.

Results

References

Elections in Iraq
1989 elections in Iraq
Iraq
April 1989 events in Asia
Election and referendum articles with incomplete results